Lorenza Mario (born 9 October 1969) is an Italian dancer, actress and television personality.

Life and career 
Born in Camposampiero, Mario began to study classical dance aged 9 years old. After graduating at the Liceo Linguistico in Padua, she debuted as a professional dancer with the company Veneto Balletto. In 1990 she made her stage debut as an actress in the play La sorpresa dell’amore, starring Ottavia Piccolo and Remo Girone.

After participating as a dancer to several variety shows, in the late 1990s Mario became popular as the primadonna of the company "Il Bagaglino" for their television and stage shows.

References

External links 
 
  

1969 births
Living people
People from Camposampiero 
Italian stage actresses
Italian television actresses 
Italian television personalities
Italian female dancers